BS 2000 (also known as Beat Science 2000) was an American rock and hip hop group formed by Adam "Ad-Rock" Horovitz (member of Beastie Boys) and Amery "AWOL" Smith (drummer for Suicidal Tendencies and touring drummer for Beastie Boys) featuring Janay North. Their music features short instrumentals fusing hip-hop, electronic effects, and low-fi video game music. Music on this album was inspired by French obscure band X-Ray pop.

In 1997, BS 2000 released their vinyl-only self-titled debut.  BS 2000 later released a limited-edition vinyl/CD, Buddy, in 2000 and Simply Mortified on vinyl and CD in 2001.

Simply Mortified was the final release through the Beastie Boys' Grand Royal label.

A remix of their song "The Scrappy" (remixed by the Latch Brothers) was featured on the American and European versions of the Xbox video game, Jet Set Radio Future.

Discography

Studio albums
BS 2000 (1997)
Beach Blanket Boggle Boogie (2000)
Buddy (2000)
Simply Mortified (2000)

Singles
"The Scrappy" (2000)
"It Feels Like" (2001)

References

External links
 BS 2000 discography

American hip hop groups
American musical duos
Beastie Boys
Hip hop duos